Mohammed Qalamuddin, an Afghan politician,  served under the Taliban regime as deputy head of the Vice and Virtue Ministry. He also served as deputy minister of mosques and Hajj, and as head of the Afghan National Olympic Committee.

References

External links
UN may lift sanctions on some former Taliban members BBC, June 2011

Year of birth missing (living people)
Living people